The North Andes Plate or North Andes Block is a small tectonic plate (microplate) located in the northern Andes. It is squeezed between the faster moving South American Plate and the Nazca Plate to the southwest. Due to the subduction of the Malpelo and Coiba Plates, this area is very prone to volcanic and seismic activity, with many historic earthquakes.

Boundaries 
The North Andes Plate is bound by (clockwise from north):
 Caribbean Plate
 South American Plate
 Malpelo Plate (before 2017 considered part of Nazca Plate)
 Coiba Plate (before 2016 considered part of Nazca Plate)
 Panama Plate

Terranes 

The Colombian part of the North Andes Plate is subdivided into several terranes:

Tectonics 
Subduction of the Coiba Plate underneath the North Andes Plate causes frequent earthquakes in the Bucaramanga Nest, the most seismically active area in the world. The Bucaramanga-Santa Marta Fault stretches along the plate for more than 600 kilometers from north to south. The plate boundary with the South American Plate is most tectonically active along a more than 900 kilometer long megaregional fault system; the Eastern Frontal Fault System.

This fault system, extending into Ecuador and Venezuela all along the northern Andes, separates the terranes from the North Andes Plate from:

References

Bibliography

Maps

Further reading 
 Bird, P. (2003) An updated digital model of plate boundaries, Geochemistry, Geophysics, Geosystems, 4(3), 1027, . 

Tectonic plates
Geology of the Andes
Geology of Colombia
Geology of Ecuador
Geology of Venezuela